The Mexican professional wrestling promotion Consejo Mundial de Lucha Libre (CMLL) has held a number of tournaments tag team or their "Trios" (three man teams) divisions over the years. Some of the tournaments were recurring, but have not been held in the last two to three years and others were one-off tournament held for a special event. Being professional wrestling tournaments, they are not won legitimately through competitive matches; instead they are won via predetermined outcomes to the matches that is generally kept secret from the general public.

Copa de Arena Mexico
CMLL held three tournaments under the name Copa de Arena Mexico, named after their main venue Arena Mexico, where all the tournaments also took place. The tournament was held in 1999, 2001 and 2002.

Copa de Arena Mexico winners

Copa de Arena Mexico 1999

The first Copa de Arena Mexico tournament was a one night, four team single-elimination tournament was held on December 10, 1999, and was also called Torneo Siglo XXI ("21st Century Tournament"). The tournament was won by "Los Guerreros del Infierno" (El Satánico, Rey Bucanero and Último Guerrero), a team name that Bucanero and Guerrero would later use when they split from El Satánico to form their own faction. The winners were given a trophy but no other tangible award was given as a result of the victory. The tournament included four teams who all teamed on a regular basis both before and after the tournament.

Tournament Participants
"Los Guapos": Bestia Salvaje, Scorpio Jr. and Shocker
"Los Guerreros del Infierno": El Satánico, Rey Bucanero and Último Guerrero (Tournament winners)
"Team Casas": Negro Casas, El Felino and Antifaz del Norte
"Team Emilio": Emilio Charles Jr., Mr. Niebla and Tarzan Boy

Tournament brackets

Copa de Arena Mexico 2001

The second Copa de Arena Mexico tournament was once again a one night single-elimination tournament, this time with eight teams instead of four. The tournament was held on December 28, 2001, and was won by "Team Shocker" (Black Warrior, Shocker, and Apolo Dantés). The winners were given a trophy but no other tangible award was given as a result of the victory. Some of the teams in the tournament worked together on a regular basis, others were created for the tournament.

Tournament Participants
Team Boricua: Gran Markus Jr., The Killer, Bestia Salvaje
Team Brazo: Brazo de Plata, Brazo de Oro and Brazo de Platino
Team Casas: Negro Casas, El Felino and La Fiera
Team Demon: Blue Demon Jr., Mr. Niebla and Starman
Team Guerreros del Infierno: Black Tiger, Rey Bucanero and Máscara Mágica
Team Infernal: El Satánico, Averno and Mephisto
Team Shocker: Shocker, Apolo Dantés and Black Warrior
Team Villano: Villano III, Villano IV and Villano V

Tournament brackets

Copa de Arena Mexico 2002

The third and last Copa de Arena Mexico tournament was a one night eight team single-elimination tournament, held on July 5, 2002, and was won by "Team Tall" (Black Warrior, Lizmark Jr., and Rayo de Jalisco Jr.). The win made Black Warrior the only wrestler to win the tournament more than once. The winners were given a trophy but no other tangible award was given as a result of the victory. Some of the teams in the tournament worked together on a regular basis, others were created for the tournament. Team Giant only consisted of two members, Giant Silva and Mr. Niebla, due to the size of Giant Silva CMLL counted him as two wrestlers for this tournament and most of the matches he participated in.

Tournament Participants
Team Giant: Giganté Silva and Mr. Niebla
Team Infernal: El Satánico, Averno and Mephisto
Team Japan: Black Tiger, Masada and Nosawa
Team Mexico: Gran Markus Jr., Poder Mexica and Mr. Mexico
Team Shocker: Shocker, Máscara Mágica and Apolo Dantés
Team Taliban: Emilio Charles Jr., Scorpio Jr. and Bestia Salvaje
Team Tall: Rayo de Jalisco Jr., Black Warrior and Lizmark Jr.
Team Villano: Villano III, Villano IV and Villano V

Tournament brackets

Copa de Oro 1994

On October 26, 1993 Consejo Mundial de Lucha Libre (CMLL) wrestler Oro died as a direct result of a match at Arena Coliseo. The following year, on September 25, 1994, CMLL held a tag team tournament in Arena Coliseo to commemorate the loss of the popular wrestler and honor his memory. The tournament winners were presented with a trophy by Oro II, the original Oro's brother who had taken the name out of respect. The tournament was an eight-team single elimination tournament won by Apolo Dantés and El Dandy.

Tournament participants
Apolo Dantés and El Dandy
Brazo de Oro and Brazo de Plata
Dr. Wagner Jr. and Gran Markus Jr.
Hayabusa and Último Dragón
Javier Cruz and Cachorro Mendoza
La Fiera and Ringo Mendoza
Negro Casas and Emilio Charles Jr.
Pierroth Jr. and El Satánico

Tournament brackets

Copa de Oro 1995

On October 26, 1993 Consejo Mundial de Lucha Libre (CMLL) wrestler Oro died as a direct result of a match at Arena Coliseo. CMLL held Copa de Oro one year later in 1994 and followed it with a second Copa de Oro in 1995 on October 24. The tournament winners were presented with a trophy by Oro II, the original Oro's brother who had taken the name out of respect. The tournament was an eight-team single elimination tournament won by Chicago Express and Pierroth Jr.

Tournament participants
Américo Rocca and Javier Cruz
Bestia Salvaje and Sangre Chicana
Blue Demon Jr. and Silver King
Brazo de Oro and El Brazo
Chicago Express and Pierroth Jr.
Emilio Charles Jr. and El Felino
Gran Markus Jr. and Hijo del Gladiador
Máscara Mágica and Ringo Mendoza

Tournament brackets

CMLL Second Generation Tag Team Tournament

Wrestling is a family tradition in Lucha libre, with a large number of second or even third-generation wrestlers following in the footsteps of their relatives. Consejo Mundial de Lucha Libre  (CMLL) held a tag team tournament on September 1, 1995, to pay homage to the wrestling families by holding a tournament for second or third-generation wrestlers. In a few cases the family relationship was not a blood relationship, but more of a storyline with the "Junior" wrestler either paying to use the name or being given the name by the "Senior". The winners got a trophy and no other tangible reward. The second-generation concept led to CMLL creating the La Copa Junior tournament in early 1996. The CMLL Second Generation Tag Team Tournament was won by the team of Apolo Dantés and Emilio Charles Jr.

Tournament Participants
Apolo Dantés and Emilio Charles Jr.
Blue Demon Jr. and Tinieblas Jr.
Brazo de Oro and Brazo de Plata
Dr. Wagner Jr. and Gran Markus Jr.
El Hijo del Santo and Rayo de Jalisco Jr.
El Hijo del Solitario and El Solitario
Espectro Jr. and Pierroth Jr.
Karloff Lagarde Jr. and Scorpio Jr.

Family Relationship

Tournament brackets

Salvador Lutteroth Trios Tournament

In 1995 Consejo Mundial de Lucha Libre (CMLL) held a one-night single elimination Trios tournament dedicated to the memory of Salvador Lutteroth, the founder of CMLL. The tournament filled the entire Friday night CMLL Super Viernes show, preceding the 1996 Homenaje a Salvador Lutteroth show becoming the unofficial forerunner for the event that is now known as Homenaje a Dos Leyendas ("Homage to two Legends") that CMLL holds every spring. The tournament was won by the team of Bestia Salvaje, Emilio Charles Jr. and Sangre Chicana, who received a trophy, but no other obvious awards for winning the tournament.

Tournament participants
Apolo Dantés, Atlantis and Rayo de Jalisco Jr.
Bestia Salvaje, Emilio Charles Jr. and Sangre Chicana
Los Brazos (Brazo de Oro, Brazo de Plata and El Brazo)
Damian el Guerrero, Guerrero del Futuro and Guerrero Maya
Dos Caras, El Dandy and Héctor Garza
La Ola Blanca (Dr. Wagner Jr., El Hijo del Gladiador and Gran Markus Jr.
Espectro Jr., Cadaver de Ultratumba and Kahoz
Los Infernales (El Satánico, Pirata Morgan and MS-1)

Tournament brackets

Salvador Lutteroth Tag Tournament
In 1999 Consejo Mundial de Lucha Libre (CMLL) held a one night, single elimination tournament on their annual Homenaje a Dos Leyendas: El Santo y Salvador Lutteroth show, which took place on March 20, 1999. The tournament was dedicated to the memory of Salvador Lutteroth, the founder of CMLL and followed both a singles tournament to honor Lutteroth the preceding year at the 1998 Homenaje a Salvador Lutteroth show and a Trios tournament. The tournament featured 8 teams in total, four teams of wrestlers whose careers peaked in the 1980s and early 1990s and four teams who were looking to make a name for themselves at the time. The last match saw the veterans Ringo Mendoza and Super Astro defeat the team of Mr. Niebla and Shocker to win the tournament and the trophy.

Veteran teams
Kahoz and Scorpio Jr.
Ringo Mendoza and Super Astro
Los Missioneros del Muerte ("The Missionaries of Death"; El Signo and Negro Navarro)
Fisman and Villano III
Younger generation
Último Guerrero and Violencia
El Felino and Máscara Mágica
Olímpico and Tony Rivera
Mr. Niebla and Shocker.

Torneo Tanque Dantes

In 2009 Consejo Mundial de Lucha Libre (CMLL) held a tag team tournament for wrestlers who work in CMLL's Guadalajara, Jalisco Arena Coliseo and its associated wrestling training school. The tournament was named after Guadalajara native and wrestling pioneer Tanque (Tank) Alfonso Dantés. The teams were paired up specifically for the tournament and did not work together on a regular basis prior to it. The teams all competed in a round robin league format, earning points for victories (two) or draws (one). The tournament started on February 15, 2009, and ran until April 12 of that year, spanning five shows in Arena Coliseo. During the tournament wrestler Boomerang had to be replaced with Meteoro for one match and Mr. Trueno replaced Rey Trueno after just one match. The team of Palacio Negro and Samurai won the tournament with four victories, 1 loss and a total of 8 points.

Torneo Increibles de Parejas, Arena Puebla 2013

Days after completing the 2013 Torneo Nacional de Parejas Increibles that concluded at the 2013 Homenaje a Dos Leyendas, CMLL held a similar tournament in Arena Puebla, in Puebla, Puebla. The tournament consisted of two qualifying blocks that took place on March 18 and 25, with a final on April 1, 2013. The tournament is based on the Lucha Libre Parejas Increibles match type where two wrestlers of opposite allegiance, portraying either villains, referred to as "Rudos" in Lucha Libre wrestling terminology or fan favorites, or "tecnicos". At times some of the team members were part of a pre-existing scripted feuds or storylines with each other. The tournament was won by Atlantis and Volador Jr. as they defeated Shocker and Rey Bucanero in the finals after the team failed to get along.

Tournament Participants
Key

Block A (March 18, 2013)
Ángel de Oro  and Rey Escorpión 
Atlantis  and Volador Jr. 
Blue Panther  and Averno 
Máscara Dorada  and Puma 
Rey Cometa  and Okumura 
La Sombra  and Mr. Águila 
Thunder  and El Terrible 
Valiente  and Niebla Roja 
Block B (March 25, 2013)
Diamante Azul  and Psicosis 
El Hijo del Fantasma  and El Felino  
La Máscara  and Dragón Rojo Jr. 
Máximo  and Mephisto 
Místico La Nueva Era  and Último Guerrero 
Brazo de Plata  and Euforia 
Shocker   and Rey Bucanero 
Stuka Jr.  and Namajague 

Tournament results

Fantastica Mania tournaments
Fantastica Mania, is a series of annual professional wrestling major show co-promoted by Mexican professional wrestling promotion Consejo Mundial de Lucha Libre (CMLL) and Japanese New Japan Pro-Wrestling (NJPW). Fantastica Mania is a series of two to seven shows that have taken place in Japan, in January of each year since 2010. Starting in 2015 the Fantastica Mania tour has included a CMLL-wrestler only tournament each year, starting with a regular tag team tournament, followed by a tag team tournament featuring only brothers in 2018, while 2019 and 2020 featured tag team tournaments with teams made up of family members.

2015 Tag team tournament

Brackets

2018 Brothers tag team tournament

Brackets

2019 Family tag team tournament

Brackets

2020 Family tag team tournament

Brackets

Torneo de parejas familiares

Torneo de parejas familiares (Spanish for "Family Tag Team Tournament") is aprofessional wrestling tournament, produced and scripted by the Mexican professional wrestling company Consejo Mundial de Lucha Libre (CMLL). The tag team tournament took place on February 24, 2020, at CMLL's regional Arena Puebla venue in Puebla, Puebla. The tournament involved eight teams of relatives, either brothers, fathers and sons or uncles and nephews.

Participants
Ángel de Oro and Niebla Roja  brothers
El Cuatrero and Sansón  brothers
Ephesto and Luciferno  brothers
Euforia and Soberano Jr.  father/son
El Felino and Negro Casas  brothers
Gran Guerrero and Último Guerrero  brothers
Máscara Año 2000 and Universo 2000 Jr.  uncle/nephew
Rey Bucanero and Drone  uncle/nephew

Brackets

Results

See also
List of CMLL singles wrestling tournaments
List of CMLL Mini-Estrellas tournaments

References

1993 in professional wrestling
1994 in professional wrestling
1995 in professional wrestling
1998 in professional wrestling
1999 in professional wrestling
2000 in professional wrestling
2001 in professional wrestling
2002 in professional wrestling
2009 in professional wrestling
2013 in professional wrestling
Lucha libre